All or Nothing is the third full-length studio release on Capitol-EMI of Canada by Canadian singer, Luba and band.  A powerful follow-up to her previous album, Between the Earth & Sky (it was another hit), and achieved platinum status due to hit singles such as "Giving Away a Miracle," "Little Salvation", "No More Words", and "Wild Heart" (produced and includes various instrumental contributions by Tom Petty & The Heartbreakers guitarist Mike Campbell).  Pianist and fellow Canadian Paul Shaffer from the Late Show with David Letterman has a solo on the song "As Good As It Gets."  Numerous other musicians have contributed to the release as well.  This would be the last studio album by Luba for a decade.

Track listing
"Wild Heart" – 4:45
"On My Way" – 3:58
"Giving Away a Miracle" – 4:41
"No More Words" – 4:56
"As Good As It Gets" - 4:22
"Too Much of a Good Thing" - 5:03
"Little Salvation" - 3:30
"In Trouble Again" - 4:04
"Milena" - 5:16
"Promise Me Anything" - 4:02
"Bringing It All Back Home" - 5:09

Personnel
 Luba: Vocals, Acoustic Guitar
 Jeff Smallwood: Guitars, Mandolin, Pedal Steel, Five String Banjo, Background Vocals
 Michel Corriveau: Organ, Piano, Wurlitzer, Harmonium, Synthesizers, Background Vocals
 Peter Marunzak: Drums, Background Vocals
 Michael (Bell) Zwonok: Bass

Additional musicians
 Mike Campbell: Guitar, Bass, Keyboards, Mandolin on "Wild Heart"
 Mickey Curry: Drums on "Giving Away a Miracle"
 Seth Glassman: Bass
 Larry Hughes: Background Vocals
 Frank Pagano: Percussion
 Steve Reid: Percussion
 Paul Shaffer: Piano Solo on "As Good As It Gets"
 Dorion Sherwood: Background Vocals
 Bette Sussman: Additional Keyboards on "No More Words"
 Tom Torre: Fiddle on "Wild Heart"
 Jimmy Vivino: Rhythm Guitar on "In Trouble Again," Acoustic Guitar on "Little Salvation," Slide Guitar on "On My Way," Background Vocals
 Peter White: Classical Guitar on "Milena"

References

 The Ectophiles' Guide to Good Music. Luba: Credits. Retrieved Apr. 18, 2007.

External links
 All or Nothing at Discogs
 Official Luba Website
 Luba at canoe.ca
 Luba on MySpace

1989 albums
Luba (singer) albums
Albums produced by Joe Chiccarelli